Fabio Mian (born February 7, 1992) is an Italian professional basketball player for Pallacanestro Trieste of the Italian Lega Basket Serie A (LBA).

Professional career

He played for two seasons, from 2018 to 2020 for Aquila Trento.

Mian signed with Cremona on August 4, 2020, after having played with the team from 2014 to 2017.

He ended the 2020–21 season with APU Udine for a short end of the season experience in the Serie A2, second tier Italian national league.

Mian, on June 30, 2021, returned in the Serie A signing a two years contract with Pallacanestro Trieste.

References

External links 
Eurobasket.com Profile

1992 births
Living people
Guards (basketball)
Aquila Basket Trento players
Italian men's basketball players
Lega Basket Serie A players
Pallacanestro Trieste players
Pallacanestro Varese players
People from Gorizia
Vanoli Cremona players
Sportspeople from Friuli-Venezia Giulia